Euchromius is a genus of moths of the family Crambidae. It was described by Achille Guenée in 1845.

Species

Euchromius anapiellus (Zeller, 1847)
Euchromius aris Schouten, 1988
Euchromius bella (Hübner, 1796)
Euchromius bleszynskiellus Popescu-Gorj, 1964
Euchromius bleszynskii Roesler, 1975
Euchromius brunnealis (Hampson, 1919)
Euchromius californicalis (Packard, 1873)
Euchromius cambridgei (Zeller, 1867)
Euchromius circulus Schouten, 1992
Euchromius confusus Schouten, 1992
Euchromius cornus Schouten, 1990
Euchromius discopis (Hampson, 1919)
Euchromius donum Schouten, 1988
Euchromius erum Schouten, 1988
Euchromius galapagosalis Capps, 1966
Euchromius geminus Schouten, 1988
Euchromius gnathosellus Schouten, 1988
Euchromius gozmanyi Bleszynski, 1961
Euchromius gratiosella (Caradja, 1910)
Euchromius hampsoni (Rothschild, 1921)
Euchromius jaxartella (Erschoff, 1874)
Euchromius keredjella (Amsel, 1949)
Euchromius klimeschi Bleszynski, 1961
Euchromius labellum Schouten, 1988
Euchromius limaellus Bleszynski, 1967
Euchromius locustus Schouten, 1988
Euchromius malekalis Amsel, 1961
Euchromius matador Bleszynski, 1966
Euchromius micralis (Hampson, 1919)
Euchromius minutus Schouten, 1992
Euchromius mouchai Bleszynski, 1961
Euchromius mythus Bleszynski, 1970
Euchromius nigrobasalis Schouten, 1988
Euchromius nivalis (Caradja in Caradja & Meyrick, 1937)
Euchromius ocellea (Haworth, 1811)
Euchromius ornatus Schouten, 1992
Euchromius pulverosa (Christoph in Romanoff, 1887)
Euchromius pygmaea (E. Hering, 1903)
Euchromius ramburiellus (Duponchel, 1836)
Euchromius rayatella (Amsel, 1949)
Euchromius saltalis Capps, 1966
Euchromius scobiolae Bleszynski, 1965
Euchromius subcambridgei Bleszynski, 1965
Euchromius sudanellus Bleszynski, 1965
Euchromius superbellus (Zeller, 1849)
Euchromius tanalis Schouten, 1988
Euchromius viettei Bleszynski, 1961
Euchromius vinculellus (Zeller, 1847)
Euchromius zagulajevi Bleszynski, 1965
Euchromius zephyrus Bleszynski, 1962

References

External links

Taxa named by Achille Guenée
Crambidae genera